The Four Seasons Hotel Vancouver was a luxury Five Star hotel in Vancouver, British Columbia, Canada. It was Cited as one of Vancouver's top hotels and located in the city's downtown core, connected to the Pacific Centre shopping mall. The Four Seasons Hotel Vancouver was the only property that was still owned and managed by Four Seasons Hotels and Resorts anywhere in Canada.

In May 2018, it was announced that the Four Seasons Hotel Vancouver would close in 2020. In January 2020, Cadillac Fairview announced that the hotel will be replaced with a new unnamed hotel, but the deal was off in May 2019.

YEW Seafood + Bar 
YEW Seafood + Bar was a seafood restaurant located within the upper lobby of the hotel and has seating for 262 people. The menu consists of modern Pacific Northwest fare.

Hotel Facilities 
 Club Four - fitness club with the only indoor-outdoor pool in Vancouver and also included a whirlpool, sauna, and cardiovascular/weight-training equipment
 RedCedar Boutique Massage Suite
 Blo Blow Dry Bar - a wash, blow-dry and style hair salon
 Stittgen Fine Jewelry - a "Made in Vancouver" custom jeweler boutique

References

External links

YEW seafood + bar

Four Seasons hotels and resorts
Hotel buildings completed in 1976
Hotels in Vancouver
Skyscrapers in Vancouver
Skyscraper hotels in Canada
1976 establishments in British Columbia